Isaac Asimov's Robot City: Refuge is a book written in 1988 by Rob Chilson. It is part of the series Isaac Asimov's Robot City, which is based on Isaac Asimov's Robot series.  It was Rob Chilson's return to writing at novel length after a break of over a decade.

Plot summary 

Derec, Ariel, their alien companion Wolruf, and Derec's robot Mandelbrot are still waiting in Dr. Avery's ship at the hyperspace relay star, Kappa Whale. Several weeks have passed since they arrived and no ship has shown up from which they could obtain navigation charts. Attempts to fix the hyperwave radio have proven futile due to the lack of knowledge of its workings. Boredom is setting in as well as an increased severity of Ariel's sickness.  Something must be done.

Wolruf and Mandelbrot both agree Derec and Ariel should use the Key of Perihelion found on the ship to transport off the ship. Though, they don't know where they will be transported to, they assume back to Robot City.  Upon activating the Key, they are transported to a small 2-room apartment, obviously not in Robot City.  An old model robot in the apartment explains they are on Earth. Since Spacers aren't generally accepted on Earth, they immediately decide to make their way to a spaceport and leave for a Spacer world and medical care for Ariel.  However, the nearest spaceport is in another city.

R. David, the robot who was left there by Dr. Avery, proceeds to prepare them identification and ration tags so they can move about the massive enclosed Earth city with relative anonymity. He also explains a few of the social cultures they will experience while on Earth.  Derec and Ariel leave the apartment to explore ways to get to the spaceport and immediately begin to experience the differences in culture between Spacer worlds and Earth, primarily the population density which far exceeds that of Spacer worlds and their comfort levels.

Almost immediately, they begin to feel claustrophobic in the completely enclosed city. When they eat at the community kitchen, which holds upwards of 10,000 hungry Earthers at once, they truly begin to grasp Earth's population and are in awe of the incredible systems needed to feed, house, and cloth it.

On the transport system, they ask for directions to the train station and their Spacer accents earn them a warning to avoid the yeast farmers. They continued to ride the transport system and eventually arrive in Yeast Town where they again ask for directions. This time their accents gain them attention of several yeast farmers who begin to chase them with anger in their voices. Derec and Ariel flee, but get cornered. In desperation, Derec activates the Key of Perihelion and they transport back to the apartment.

They venture back out and, with directions from R. David, reach the train station. There they see that the train is completely enclosed (Earthers prefer not knowing they are in wide-open spaces) and decide they couldn't handle being in a small car with no windows for 12 hours.

The next day they go to the library to research other methods and discover transport trucks which drive on roads in the open between cities. They figure they could learn to drive a truck and steal one fairly easily since Earthers wouldn't expect that sort of crime from the population. They go to driving school where they are successful in learning to drive due their skills as space ship operators. Then they make their way to the docks scope out how to steal a truck, but are discovered and chased off. Though they escape, they are very tired and retire to the apartment.

The more of Earth's culture they experience, the more they begin to appreciate the Earth people and how they live. They begin seeing similarities in Earth and Spacer culture and begin to accept that aspects of Earth's culture even exceed that of Spacer culture.

Areil's disease has finally climaxed. Her lack of appetite, fatigue, and lack of concentration are worse than ever. Upon their return to the apartment, R. David immediately notices her health as drastically changed and urges that it take her to the hospital due to its First Law obligation. They submit to the notion they will not get off Earth to a Spacer world in time and decide to go to an Earth hospital.

The hospital staff is suspicious of their story and Spacer accents, but help Ariel anyway. They eventually diagnose Ariel with Amnemonic Plague and begin treating her. It is a disease that, once it has infected the mind, is very hard to cure. They tell Derec that as advanced as it has progressed that it's not 100% she will make it, but there is hope.

Because of their being Spacers, the medical staff insists on testing Derec for diseases that would be benign to Earthers but fatal to Spacers. Despite the prophylactic given to them by R. David (designed by Dr. Avery), he submits to the test. Derec is again impressed with Earth and is ashamed that he assumed they would need to get to a Spacer world for proper medical help. The reality is Earth hospitals deal with much more disease and injury than any Spacer hospital. The test results show he is healthy, but indicate he had once suffered from Amnemonic Plague, too, explaining his memory loss.

In efforts to replace Ariel's memory once she recovers, Derec begins encoding everything he remembers about her. Those encodings, along with encodings done by the medical robots, are used to kick start her memories when she wakes up. While Ariel is recovering, Derec is questioned by the Terrestrial Bureau of Investigation about what two Spacers were doing on Earth. Derec is able to convince the agent they were students studying human behavior patterns and their anonymity was important since Earthers would have treated the Spacers differently if they knew. They both agree that now "their cover was blown," Derec and Ariel would leave Earth.

As Ariel recovers, Derec begins to fall ill. Nightmares of Robot City, lack of appetite, and fatigue cause him to lose weight and strength. He eventually becomes aware of the Chemfets in him, which are microscopic circuit boards Dr. Avery injected him with and they are multiplying in his blood. Also, an implant in his brain has been trying to communicate with them. He realizes all of this at the point the implant and the Chemfets first are able to communication.

When Ariel is well enough to move, they request to visit the outside and are granted the odd request due to the fact they are Spacers and would be physiologically benefited by such a venture (as opposed to an Earther who would essentially go crazy). Outside, accompanied by a medical robot, Derec goes into a seizure and the robot runs for help. The seizure subsides and Derec explains they must return to Robot City and get Dr. Avery to reverse the process. They use the Key to return to the apartment.

Once there, R. David tells them Dr. Avery has a spaceship at the spaceport in New York and they can fly there fairly easily They choose this method and escape Earth with no problems.

Once in space, they prepare to return to Kappa Whale to join Wolruf and Mandelbrot again and to continue to Robot City along the trajectory they took from Robot City to the relay spot.  Once away from Earth's space, they are attacked by a ship that turns out to be Aranimass. He was able to follow the radio signature produced when a Key fires.  Derec and Ariel decide to ram Aranimass' ship then use the Key to escape to Earth. A third ship enters the scuffle which turns out to be Wolruf and Mandelbrot who had followed the same radio signature.

They eventually destroys Aranimass' ship, but there is severe damage to the other two ships rendering all three almost useless. Aranimass escapes in the command part of his ship. While scouting the wreckage of Aranimass' ship, they find a Robot City robot holding a Double Key of Perihelion. Unlike all of the Keys Derek and Ariel have used thus far, it seems that one of the Double Keys can have its ending location programmed. This means this Double Key would be used to go somewhere and then return, probably to Robot City, using the second of the set. Since a robot had it, the Key is coded to be used only by a robot.

Thus, Mandelbrot takes the Key and secures Wolruf, Derec, and Ariel with his special arm and activates the key. They arrive back on top of the Compass Tower overlooking Robot City.

References

External links 
 Isaac Asimov's Robot-Empire-Foundation Series Timeline
 

1988 novels
1988 science fiction novels